The American Basketball League (ABL) was an early professional basketball league. During six seasons from 1925–26 to 1930–31, the ABL was the first attempt to create a major professional basketball league in the United States. Joseph Carr, who was, in 1925, the president of the recently founded, three year old National Football League, organized the ABL from nine of the best independent pro teams from the East and the Midwest. George Halas of the NFL Chicago Bears was the owner of the Chicago Bruins, and department store magnate Max Rosenblum, a part owner of the NFL's Cleveland Bulldogs, financed the Cleveland Rosenblums. Future NFL (Washington Redskins) owner George Preston Marshall, the owner of a chain of laundries, was owner of the Washington Palace Five. Other teams were the Boston Whirlwinds, Brooklyn Arcadians, Buffalo Bisons, Detroit Pulaski Post Five, Fort Wayne Caseys, and Rochester Centrals. With the exception of 1927–28, the ABL season was divided into two halves, with the winner of the first half playing the winner of the second half for the championship. Five games into the 1926–27 season, the Original Celtics were admitted to replace the Brooklyn franchise, and won 32 of the remaining 37 games, then shifted to New York the following season.

For the 1927–28 season, the ABL had an Eastern (New York, Philadelphia, Rochester and Washington) and Western (Chicago, Cleveland, Detroit and Fort Wayne) division, with the two best teams in each division going to playoffs, and a championship between the playoff winners. Playing in Madison Square Garden, the New York Celtics had a 40–9 record in the regular season and won the championship. At season's end, the champions were voted out of the league by the other owners. The ABL played three more seasons and then, with only five teams playing at the end of 1930–31, folded during the Great Depression.

After more than two years, the league was reorganized in 1933, but as an East Coast league, with teams in Pennsylvania and New York City metro area.

The league did take some measures to help modernize the game. One of the major issues that had plagued basketball was players jumping from team to team. To combat this, teams began signing players to contracts. Often these contracts went up to $1,500 per month, which was considerably more than what an average laborer was making at the time ($15 per week). New rules that were implemented included making backboards mandatory, adding a three second lane violation, and implementing foul outs. The ABL also eliminated the double dribble, which was done to encourage many of the game's top college stars to play in the league.

The 1925–26 season saw Cleveland, the second half winner, defeat Brooklyn, winner of the first half of the season, three games to none. The Boston Whirlwinds dropped out of the league. The Original Celtics were one of the top teams at the time, but refused to join the ABL, instead opting to be an "at Large" member. This conflict resulted in Boston dropping out, and refusing to take part in the second half of the season. One of the early stars for the league was Cleveland's Honey Russell whose 7.4 points was the second highest average in the league. Cleveland drew well, bringing in nearly 10,000 fans a game, while Brooklyn could only draw around 2,000.

1926–27 season
The league knew they had a problem when it came to the Celtics. So the league opted to force the hands of the Celtics ownership. The teams in the league agreed to prohibiting any games against the Celtics, and this left the Celtics with a dilemma. They could either join the American Basketball League, or they could try and schedule games against lesser competition, thus possibly losing out on drawing bigger crowds. In the end, ownership decided that it was worth the draw to join the ABL, so they did. the team won the league title. They defeated Cleveland, which, despite still being a good team, was not the dominant force that had won the title the year before. Honey Russell, without a doubt the team's top star, got into a dispute with owner Max Rosenblum, thus leading to his contract being sold to Chicago. Cleveland also lost Vic Hanson, who had been one of the top college stars, but did not like the rough style of the pro level, and also did not care for the overall lack of playing time he was getting. The Celtics represented the borough of Brooklyn, which had been without a team after the Brooklyn Arcadians dropped out of the league. The Celtics assumed Brooklyn's 0–5 start. The league also lost the team in Detroit, which dropped out after a 0–6 start.

1927–28 season
Once again, the ABL placed a team in Detroit, and once again it was a failure. Detroit was 5-13 when it opted to disband on January 3, 1927. The Washington franchise on that same day was shifted to Brooklyn. The Celtics this time represented the city of New York. Joe Lapchick, Nat Holman, Pete Berry, Dutch Dehnert and Davey Banks.  They led the New York Celtics to a 40–9 record. The playoffs saw Fort Wayne defeat Cleveland 2 games to 0, and New York defeated Philadelphia 2 games to zero. In the championship series, New York defeated Fort Wayne 3 games to 1. The playoffs would be Philadelphia's last appearance in the league, as the team folded, becoming the third league team to do so.

1928–29 season
During the 1927–28 season, the league divided the league into divisions, Eastern and Western. The 1928–29 season saw the format discarded. The Celtics were dominant, to the point that the league was suffering. The rally cry of "Break up the Celtics" was heeded. Players were dispersed to other teams, and this also resolved an issue for Celtics owner Jim Furey, who had issues with Madison Square Garden management. The arena's owners sought to evict the Celtics, who despite being a dominant team, never drew well at home. Cleveland, through purchase and trades, ended up with nearly all of the Celtics players on their roster. Cleveland ran away with the title, defeating Fort Wayne four games to none in the playoffs.

1929–30 season
The New York Stock Market crashed on October 29, 1929. John J. O'Brien the League's president, took the viewpoint that the "Great Depression" economic / financial slump would not last long, and the ABL continued business as usual. Former Celtics owner Jim Furey had just been released from prison, and put together a new version of the Celtics. However, the players were quickly becoming past their prime, and Nat Holman didn't play weekend games because he was a coach for the City College of New York. However, Cleveland still managed to win the league title, defeated Rochester and their star player, Tiny Hearn a six-foot, nine inch rookie star from Georgia Tech. However, there would never be a dynasty for Cleveland. The stock Market crash took its toll on the ABL. During the 1930–31 season, Max Rosenblum shocked the world of basketball when he announce that his Cleveland team would cease operations. Rosenblum was unable to pay the contracts that he signed his players to. George Halas at the end of the season, opted to fold his struggling Chicago Bruins club, and Toledo, which featured three former Celtics stars, Denhert, Lapchick, and Berry, shockingly finished in last place, with a record of four wins, and eleven losses. Fort Wayne defeated Chicago, and lost to Brooklyn in the finals, as Brooklyn won would ultimately be the league's last championship.

American Basketball League teams, 1925/26 to 1930/31
 Boston Whirlwinds (1925/26, expelled after 1st half)
 Brooklyn Arcadians (1925/26–26/27, replaced by New York Celtics after 5 games)
 Buffalo Bisons (1925/26)
 Chicago Bruins (1925/26–30/31)
 Cleveland Rosenblums (1925/26–30/31, also known as the Rosies)
 Detroit Lions (1925/26–26/27, as Detroit Pulaski Post Five in 1925/26 and at beginning of 1926/27; dropped out after 6 games)
 Fort Wayne Hoosiers (1925/26–30/31, as Fort Wayne Caseys in 1925/26)
 Rochester Centrals (1925/26–30/31)
 Washington Palace Five (1925/26–27/28, also known as the Laundrymen; dropped out in January 1928 and replaced by Brooklyn Visitations)
 Baltimore Orioles (1926/27)
 New York Celtics (1926/27–27/28, 1929/30, 1937/38, also known as the Original Celtics; as Brooklyn Celtics in 1926/27; dropped out in December 1929)
 Philadelphia Warriors (1926/27–28/29, also known as the Quakers; as Philadelphia Phillies in 1926/27)
 Brooklyn Visitations (1927/28–30/31)
 Detroit Cardinals (1927/28, also known as the Olympians; dropped out in January 1928)
 New York Hakoahs (1928/29)
 Paterson Crescents (1928/29–30/31, as Paterson Whirlwinds in 1928/29; dropped out in December 1930)
 Trenton Bengals (1928/29, also known as the Royal Bengals)
 Syracuse All-Americans (1930/31, dropped out in January 1931)
 Toledo Red Men Tobaccos (1930/31)

American Basketball League teams, 1933/34 to 1954/55
 Bronx Americans (1933/34)
 Brooklyn Visitations (1933/34–38/39, as Paterson Visitations in 1936/37; moved to Brooklyn in November 1936)
 Jersey Reds (1933/34–39/40, as Union City Reds in 1933/34; merged into New York Jewels in January 1940)
 New Britain Mules (1933/34–34/35, as Hoboken Thourots in 1933/34; moved to Camden in November 1933; as Camden Brewers in 1933/34; taken over and moved to New Britain in January 1934; as New Britain Palaces in 1933/34; as New Britain Jackaways in 1934/35; merged with Newark Mules to form New Britain Mules for the 2nd half of 1934/35)
 New York Jewels (1933/34–42/43, as Brooklyn Jewels in 1933/34; as New York Jewels in 1934/35–36/37; renamed Brooklyn Jewels for 2nd half of 1936/37; as New Haven Jewels in 1937/38; moved to New York in November 1937 and renamed New York Jewels; absorbed Jersey Reds in January 1940; dropped out in 1st half of 1941/42)
 Newark Mules (1933/34–34/35, as Newark Bears in 1933/34; also known as Newark Joe Fays in 1933/34; merged with New Britain Jackaways for the 2nd half of 1934/35 to become the New Britain Mules)
 Philadelphia SPHAs (1933/34–48/49, also known as the Hebrews)
 Trenton Moose (1933/34)
 Boston Trojans (1934/35)
 Kingston Colonials (1935/36–39/40, merged with Troy Celtics in December 1939)
 Passaic Red Devils (1935/36, also known as the Reds; as Paterson Panthers in 1935/36; moved to Trenton in December 1935; as Trenton Bengals in 1935/36; moved to Passaic for 2nd half of 1935/36)
 New York Yankees (1937/38, as Bronx Yankees in 1937/38; renamed New York Yankees during 1937/38; dropped out in January 1938)
Troy Haymakers (1938/39 ; as Troy Celtics in 1939/40–40/41 absorbed Kingston Colonials in December 1939; moved to Brooklyn during 1st half of 1940/41 to become Brooklyn Celtics)
 Washington Brewers (1938/39–41/42, as Washington Heurichs in 1938/39, as Washington Heurich Brewers in 1939–40)
 Wilkes-Barre Barons (1938/39–39/40, dropped out in February 1940)
 Trenton Tigers (1941/42–49/50)
 Wilmington Blue Bombers (1941/42)
 Brooklyn Indians (1942/43–43/44, as Camden Indians in 1942/43; moved to Brooklyn in January 1943; dropped out during 1st half of 1943/44)
 Harrisburg Senators (1942/43)
 New York Americans (1943/44)
 Wilmington Bombers (1943/44–46/47)
 Baltimore Bullets (1944/45–46/47) joined the Basketball Association of America
 Brooklyn Gothams (1944/45–48/49, as Westchester Indians in 1944/45; moved to New York in January 1945; as New York Gothams in 1944/45–45/46)
 Paterson Crescents (1944/45–50/51, as Washington Capitols in 1944/45; moved to Paterson in January 1945)
 Hartford Hurricanes (1946/47–49/50, as Elizabeth Braves in 1946/47–47/48; moved to Hartford in December 1947)
 Scranton Miners (1946/47–52/53, as Jersey City Atoms in 1946/47–47/48; moved to Scranton in January 1948)
 Troy Celtics (1946/47)
 Yonkers Chiefs (1946/47, as Newark Bobcats in 1946/47; moved to Yonkers during 1946/47; dropped out during 1946/47 season)
 Lancaster Roses (1947/48, franchise terminated in December 1947)
 Wilkes-Barre Barons (1947/48–52/53)
 Bridgeport Roesslers (1948/49–51/52, as Bridgeport Newfield Steelers in 1948/49; as Bridgeport Aer-A-Sols in 1949/50)
 Glens Falls-Saratoga (1949/50–52/53, as New York Harlem Yankees in 1949/50; as Saratoga Harlem Yankees 1950/51-51/52; moved to Schenectady during 1951/52; as Schenectady Yankees in 1951/52; moved to Saratoga during 1951/52; as Saratoga Harlem Yankees in 1951/52; dropped out in February 1953)
 Schenectady Packers (1949/50, dropped out in November 1949)
 Carbondale Aces (1950/51)
 Utica Pros (1950/51)
 Elmira Colonels (1951/52–52/53)
 Manchester British-Americans (1951/52–52/53)
 Middletown Guards Mike Lee averaged 43.2 points in 1952 for the Guards (1952/53)
 Pawtucket Slaters (1952/53)

League championships

Season scoring leaders

The American Basketball League's (ABL) scoring title was awarded to the player with the most total points in a given season.

References
 David S. Neft and Richard M. Cohen, The Sports Encyclopedia: Pro Basketball (5th Edition) (St. Martin's Press, 1992)

Citations

External links
 ABL yearly standings – Association of Professional Basketball Research

 
Sports leagues established in 1925
Sports leagues disestablished in 1955
Defunct basketball leagues in the United States